The Prüm Convention (inaccurately known as Schengen III Agreement) is a law enforcement treaty which was signed on 27 May 2005 by Austria, Belgium, France, Germany, Luxembourg, the Netherlands and Spain in the town of Prüm in Germany, and which is open to all members of the European Union, 14 of which are currently parties.

The treaty was based on an initiative by the then German Minister Otto Schily from mid-2003. Core elements of the convention were picked up by EU Council Decision 2008/615/JHA on 23 June 2008 on the stepping up of cross-border cooperation, particularly in combating terrorism and cross-border crime.

The full name of the treaty is Convention between the Kingdom of Belgium, the Federal Republic of Germany, the Kingdom of Spain, the French Republic, the Grand Duchy of Luxembourg, the Kingdom of the Netherlands and the Republic of Austria on the stepping up of cross-border cooperation, particularly in combating terrorism, cross-border crime and illegal migration.

Contents of the Convention
The Convention was adopted so as to enable the signatories to exchange data regarding DNA, fingerprints and vehicle registration of concerned persons and to cooperate against terrorism. It also contains provisions for the deployment of armed sky marshals on flights between signatory states, joint police patrols, entry of (armed) police forces into the territory of another state for the prevention of immediate danger (hot pursuit), and cooperation in case of mass events or disasters. Furthermore, a police officer responsible for an operation in a state may, in principle, decide to what degree the police forces of the other states that were taking part in the operation could use their weapons or exercise other powers.

Relation to the European Union
The Convention was adopted outside of the European Union framework (and its mechanism of enhanced co-operation), but asserts that it is open for accession by any member state of the European Union and that:

Additionally the text of the Convention and its annexes were circulated on 7 July 2005 between the delegations to the Council of the European Union.

Prüm Decision
Some of the Convention provisions, falling under the former third pillar of the EU, were later subsumed into the police and judicial cooperation provisions of European Union law by a 2008 Council Decision, commonly referred to as the Prüm Decision. It provides for Law Enforcement Cooperation in criminal matters primarily related to exchange of fingerprint, DNA (both on a hit no-hit basis) and Vehicle owner registration (direct access via the EUCARIS system) data. The data exchange provisions are to be implemented in 2012. The remaining provisions of the Convention falling under the former third pillar are not yet adopted into EU law.

While the Decisions were originally applicable to all EU member states, the United Kingdom subsequently exercised their right to opt-out from them effective 1 December 2014.  However, the UK committed to assess their future participation and make a decision by 31 December 2015 on whether to rejoin the Decisions. On 22 January 2016 the UK notified the EU of its desire to resume participating in the Prum Decisions, which was approved by the Commission on 20 May 2016.

Prüm II 
Announced in Spring 2021 Prüm II aims to expand the amount of information that can be shared, potentially including photos and information from driving licenses which raises concerns in regard to facial recognition in particular in regard to using existing photos such as police mugshots against newly captured images such as those from CCTV camera

Parties to the convention
The states which have ratified the convention are:

The Dutch Senate ratified the treaty without a vote.

Greece, Italy, Portugal and Sweden, have notified the Council of the European Union of their desire to accede to the Prüm Convention.

Norway and Iceland signed a treaty with the EU in 2009 to apply certain provisions of the Decisions.  Norway ratified the agreement and it entered into force for it as of 1 December 2020, while Iceland has not ratified as of February 2023.  Denmark, Ireland and the United Kingdom have opt-outs from participating in the Council Decision approving the agreement with Norway and Iceland.  While Ireland and the United Kingdom decided to opt-in, the agreement does not apply to Denmark.  Switzerland and Liechtenstein signed agreements on their participation in the Prüm regime on 27 June 2019.  Ireland and the UK again opted to participate in the agreement.  Switzerland ratified the agreement and it entered into force for it as of 3 March 2023, while Liechtenstein has not ratified as of February 2023. 

On the 23 June 2016 the United Kingdom voted to leave the EU. After withdrawal negotiations concluded, the United Kingdom left the EU on the 31 January 2020.

See also
 Schengen Area
 Schengen Agreement
 Area of freedom, security and justice
 Enhanced co-operation

References

External links
Official depositary page
https://www.auswaertiges-amt.de/blob/248566/d8ad2b24a9f99dd8aa3f7eb02008be43/statusliste-en-data.pdf
 Text of the Prüm Convention
 The Prüm Process: Playing or abusing the system?
 The Prüm Regime: Situated Dis/Empowerment in Transnational DNA Profile Exchange, see: 

Treaties of the European Union
Treaties concluded in 2005
Treaties entered into force in 2006
Treaties of Austria
Treaties of Belgium
Treaties of Bulgaria
Treaties of Estonia
Treaties of Finland
Treaties of France
Treaties of Germany
Treaties of Hungary
Treaties of Luxembourg
Treaties of the Netherlands
Treaties of Romania
Treaties of Slovenia
Treaties of Slovakia
Treaties of Spain
Terrorism treaties
Boundary treaties
2005 in Germany
Crime in Europe
Multi-speed Europe